Trigonosciadium brachytaenium is a species of flowering plant in the Apiaceae family. It is endemic to Iran. It is commonly called golparak (گلپرک in Persian).

References

Sources
Muẓaffariyān, Valī Allāh. 1996. Farhang-i nāmhā-yi giyāhān-i Īrān: Lātīnī, Inglīsī, Fārsī. Tihrān: Farhang-i Muʻāṣir.

Apioideae
Flora of Iran
Taxa named by Pierre Edmond Boissier